Yi Go (?–1171) was a military ruler in Korea. He, with many other military colonels, overthrew King Uijong in the year 1170. When he proceeded to plan a revolt, he was murdered by Yi Ui-bang.

Popular culture
 Portrayed Park Jun-gyu in the 2003-2004 KBS TV series Age of Warriors.

See also
List of Goryeo people
Goryeo

References 

12th-century Korean people
Korean generals
1171 deaths
Year of birth unknown